Sólo le pido a Dios (in English: I only ask of God) is a famous protest song, written by Argentine singer-songwriter León Gieco. It is the first song of Gieco's 1978 album, IV LP.

History 

Gieco wrote it in 1978, at his parents' house in his childhood village of Cañada Rosquín, a small town in the north of Santa Fe Province, Argentina. In fact, he wrote it in presence of his father, who told him that the song would be a "world-renowned" song, something it would eventually achieve. Gieco composed this song first trying out melodies with his harmonica and guitar. Then he began to write personal feelings, that gradually turned into phrases inspired by the harsh social events of the time, such as the military dictatorship of his country, Mercedes Sosa's exile and the threat of war between Chile and Argentina at the time.

The author doubted whether or not to include the song on his album IV LP, believing it was "boring and monotonous", but finally followed the advice of Charly García to include it and, thereafter, Gieco sang it as his closing song and has played it in all his national and international tours.

It was finally published in the album IV LP, 1978; since then it has been interpreted by various artists both from Argentina and around the world.

Versions 
This song has been covered by various artists around the world and translated into more than twenty-five languages, including English, Portuguese, Basque, German, Quechua, Catalan, Persian, Arabic, Armenian, Hebrew.

 León Gieco
 Ana Belén
 Antonio Flores
 Beth Carvalho 
 Emma Shapplin
 Fiel a la Vega
 Florent Pagny 
 Gervasio
 Ginevra Di Marco
 Imca Marina
 Javiera y Los Imposibles
 Joan Manuel Serrat
 Juan Diego Flórez
 Luciano Pereyra
 Mercedes Sosa
 Miguel Ríos
 Nicole
 Mario Guerrero 
 Kata 
 Leo Rey
 Outlandish  
 Bruce Springsteen
 Paulina Rubio
 Pete Seeger
 Pibes Chorros
 Piero De Benedictis
 Raúl Porchetto
 Sergio Denis
 Sixto Palavecino  
 Shakira
 Tania Libertad
 Kleiton e Kledir
 U2
 Víctor Heredia
 Víctor Manuel

See also 
National Reorganization Process
Mercedes Sosa

References 

1978 songs
Argentine songs
Argentine rock songs
Protest songs